This is a bibliography of U.S. congressional memoirs by former and current U.S. senators.

The United States Senate is the upper house of the bicameral legislature of the United States, and together with the United States House of Representatives comprises the United States Congress. The composition and powers of the Senate are established in Article One of the U.S. Constitution. Each U.S. state is represented by two senators, regardless of population. Senators serve staggered six-year terms. The chamber of the United States Senate is located in the north wing of the Capitol, in Washington, D.C., the national capital. The House of Representatives convenes in the south wing of the same building.

Congressional memoirs

Notes

See also
 U.S. representative bibliography (congressional memoirs)
 List of American political memoirs

Books about American politicians

Political bibliographies
Bibliography